The hwan was the currency of the Republic of Korea (South Korea) between February 15, 1953, and June 9, 1962. It succeeded the first South Korean won and preceded the second South Korean won.

History
Due to the devaluation of the first South Korean won (from 15 won to the U.S. dollar in 1945 to 6000 won to the dollar in 1953), the hwan was introduced in 1953 at the rate of 1 hwan = 100 won. The hwan was nominally subdivided into 100 jeon but the lowest denomination issued was 1 hwan. The hwan also suffered from inflation and a series of devaluations occurred.

In 1962, the second South Korean won was reintroduced at a rate of 1 won = 10 hwan, after which inflation finally slowed down.

Coins
In 1959, coins were introduced in denominations of 10, 50 and 100 hwan. They were minted by the Philadelphia Mint.

The 10 and 50 hwan coins continued to circulate until March 22, 1975, but the 100 hwan coins were withdrawn on June 10, 1962.

Banknotes
In 1953, banknotes were introduced in denominations of 1, 5, 10, 100 and 1000 hwan. Some of these notes were printed in the U.S. and gave the denomination in English and Hangul as won. 500 hwan notes were introduced in 1956, followed by 1000 hwan in 1957 and 50 hwan in 1958.

American printed notes
The first hwan notes were printed by the United States Government Printing Office. All Hanja and Hangul inscription on both the obverse and reverse sides of these notes are written right to left (traditional direction), instead of the modern (Westernized) left to right.

They have a few obvious defects. The term "hwan" is written in Hanja (圜) while "won" is written in Hangul (원) and English. Those problems were attributed to an urgent need for new banknotes and the change in currency name, as well as the decision to commission the new notes to be manufactured in the United States. Unaware banknote catalog editors may erroneously categorize these notes as part of the old won system, such as the Standard Catalog of World Paper Money by Albert Pick.

Korean printed notes

See also

Economy of South Korea
History of South Korea

References

External links

 Bank of Korea, 1953-1962 banknotes
Bank of Korea, A Brief History of Korean Currency
Bank of Korea, Currency Issue System

Currencies of South Korea
Modern obsolete currencies
1953 in South Korea
1953 establishments in South Korea
1962 disestablishments
Economic history of South Korea